Neville Bannister (born 21 July 1937) is an English former footballer who scored 30 goals from 154 appearances in the Football League playing as an outside right for Bolton Wanderers, Lincoln City, Hartlepools United and Rochdale.

Bannister came through the junior teams at Bolton Wanderers and made his debut in the 1955–56 season. He scored the second goal, and set up the fourth for Nat Lofthouse, as Bolton beat league champions Wolverhampton Wanderers 4–1 in the 1958 FA Charity Shield. Lincoln City signed him in 1961 in what proved an unsuccessful attempt to avoid relegation from the Second Division. He also played league football for Hartlepools United and Rochdale before moving into non-league with Lancashire Combination club Fleetwood. He went on to become chairman of Blackpool Rangers Juniors F.C.

References

1937 births
Living people
People from Brierfield, Lancashire
English footballers
Association football wingers
Bolton Wanderers F.C. players
Lincoln City F.C. players
Hartlepool United F.C. players
Rochdale A.F.C. players
Fleetwood Town F.C. players
English Football League players